Giuseppe Bartolomei (12 January 1923 – 28 September 1996) was an Italian politician.

He was municipal councilor in Arezzo; in 1961, he became head of the secretariat of the Prime Minister Amintore Fanfani.

Bartolomei was elected Senator in 1963 and held office until 1983; during his parliamentary activity he was Chairman of the DC senators from July 1973 to October 1980. He also served as Minister of Agriculture and Forests in the Forlani Cabinet and in the two Spadolini Cabinets.

At the end of his experience in Parliament, he assumed the role of president of Banca Toscana, which he maintained until a few months before his death in September 1996.

References

Bibliography
 Giuseppe Bartolomei. Coscienza cristiana e responsabilità democratica: riflessioni politiche lungo i sentieri del Novecento, a cura di Omar Ottonelli, Firenze, Polistampa, 2013.

1923 births
1996 deaths
People from the Province of Arezzo
Christian Democracy (Italy) politicians
Agriculture ministers of Italy
Senators of Legislature IV of Italy
Senators of Legislature V of Italy
Senators of Legislature VI of Italy
Senators of Legislature VII of Italy
Senators of Legislature VIII of Italy
Politicians of Tuscany